Derick is both a masculine given name and a surname. It is a variant of Derrick. People with the name include:

Given name
Derick Adamson (born 1958), Jamaican runner
Derick Amadi (born 1984), Nigerian footballer
Derick Armstrong (born 1979), American football player
Derick Ashe (1919–2000), British diplomat
Derick Baegert (1440–1515), German painter
Derick Brassard (born 1987), Canadian hockey player
Derick Brownell (born 1974), American soccer player
Derick Burleson (1963–2016), American writer
Derick Cabrido (born 1984), Filipino filmmaker
Derick Close (born 1927), English motorcycle racer
Derick Downs (born 1984), American entrepreneur
Derick Etwaroo (born 1964), Canadian cricketer
Derick Fernando da Silva (born 2002), Brazilian footballer
Derick K. Grant (born 1973), American tap dancer
Derick Hall (born 2001), American football player
Derick Amory (1899–1981), British politician
Derick Hetherington (1911–1992), British naval officer 
Derick Hougaard (born 1983), South African rugby union footballer
Derick Latibeaudiere (born 1961), Jamaican politician
Derick Martini (born 1972), American screenwriter
Derick Minnie (born 1986), Italian rugby union footballer
Derick Neikirk (born 1974), American wrestler and baseball player
Derick Ogbu (born 1990), Nigerian footballer
Derick Osei (born 1998), French footballer
Derick Parry (born 1954), West Indian cricketer
Derick Roberson (born 1995), American football player
Derick Sequeira (born 1996), Canadian-Nicaraguan footballer
Derick Silva (born 1998), Brazilian track athlete
Derick Snow, American voice actor
Derick Thomson (1921–2012), Scottish poet
Derick Wanganeen (born 1991), Australian rules footballer
Derick Wood (1940–2010), English computer scientist

Surname
Carrie Derick (1862–1941), Canadian botanist

See also
Derek, people with the given name of Derek
Derrick, a variation of Derick
Darrick, people with the given name of Darrick
Derricks (disambiguation), a disambiguation page

English masculine given names
English-language surnames
Surnames from given names